Fellows Lake is an  source of water for the city of Springfield, Missouri. The lake was created by the impoundment of the Little Sac River behind the Fellows Lake Dam. The dam was originally constructed in 1955 and modified in 1991. The earthen and rock dam stands 102 feet high. It is 1,500 feet long at its crest and impounds a maximum capacity of 36,368 acre-feet. Fellows Lake is managed cooperatively by City Utilities of Springfield and the Missouri Department of Conservation. 

The lake is also developing into one of the state's premier fisheries of Muskellunge. In 2016, the largest muskie sampled by the Missouri Department of Conservation in their annual fish survey was 46 inches long.

Recreational activities 
Due to its proximity to Springfield, Fellows Lake has an array of public areas for picnicking, barbecuing, and gathering places. The park surrounding the lake to the north houses one large pavilion on a large open grass area which is frequently used by kite-fliers. The lake also houses two major boat docks and one year-round marina for boat storage and kayak rental. A permit is required to launch a boat. 

There is also a small  remote control airplane field run by the Springfield RC Club one mile (1.6 km) north of the lake.

Sport fishing opportunities include largemouth bass, black and white crappie, catfish, walleye, muskie, and white bass. Sunfish, carp, and perch are frequently caught. Muskies are stocked yearly by the conservation department.

Fellows Lake is in the midst of installation of a multiple mile walking and biking trail now nearly complete and virtually circumferential with the exception of the southeast arm of the lake.

Condtion 
The marina was inspected by city engineers and found that the metal bracing substructure was deteriorated and the 50 year old boat dock needs to be replaced. The City of Springfield intends to update the boat dock, build new campsites and a biking trail around the whole of the lake.

References

External links
Springfield RC Club
Springfield Park Board

Protected areas of Greene County, Missouri
Buildings and structures in Greene County, Missouri
Reservoirs in Missouri
Dams in Missouri
United States local public utility dams
Bodies of water of Greene County, Missouri
1955 establishments in Missouri